Montalbetti is a surname. Notable people with the surname include:

Christine Montalbetti (born 1965), French novelist, playwright, and professor
Éric Montalbetti (born 1968), French composer 
Mario Montalbetti (born 1958), Peruvian linguist
Mauro Montalbetti (born 1969), Italian composer